Jakara Anthony,  (born 8 July 1998) is an Australian freestyle skier and Olympic gold medalist. She competed in the 2018 Winter Olympics, finishing 4th, the best-ever result for an Australian female mogul skier. Anthony won the Women's Moguls event at the 2022 Winter Olympics. At the 2019 World Ski Championships she finished 2nd.

She is currently studying for a Bachelor of Exercise and Sport Science at Deakin University.

Anthony was awarded the Medal of the Order of Australia in the 2022 Queen's Birthday Honours for service to sport as a gold medallist at the Beijing Winter Olympic Games 2022.

Olympic results
 1 medal – (1 gold)

World Championships results
 1 medal – (1 silver)

References

External links

1998 births
Australian female freestyle skiers
Freestyle skiers at the 2017 Asian Winter Games
Freestyle skiers at the 2018 Winter Olympics
Freestyle skiers at the 2022 Winter Olympics
Living people
Medalists at the 2022 Winter Olympics
Olympic freestyle skiers of Australia
Olympic gold medalists for Australia
Olympic medalists in freestyle skiing
Sportspeople from Cairns
Recipients of the Medal of the Order of Australia